Johar Mehmood in Goa is a 1965 Bollywood comedy film directed by I. S. Johar with he himself, along with Mehmood and Simi Garewal playing the lead roles. Its part of a comedy series that included Johar in Kashmir (1966), Johar in Bombay (1967) and Johar Mehmood in Hong Kong (1971).

Plot
Pregnant Mary is about to be married to Peter when he is asked to re-join his regiment to go to war. But he does not come back and is assumed to be dead. Mary gives birth to twins but leaves them on the doorsteps of two Goan households, one Muslim and another Hindu. Twenty four years later, India is a free country, while Goa is under the rule of the Portuguese. Ram and Rahim grow up to be members of underground resistance movement. Mary is the Mother Superior and Peter, who is still alive, is the Deputy Superintendent of Police in Goa, who is entrusted the task of catching Ram and Rahim who plan and execute series of anti-state activities.

Cast

Soundtrack
The music of the film was composed by Kalyanji–Anandji and lyrics by Qamar Jalalabadi.

"Aji Aisi Nazar ko" – Mohammed Rafi
"Aankhiyan Na Noor Hai Tu" – Mukesh, Suman Kalyanpur
"Dheere Dheere Chalo" – Mukesh
"Kuch Bhi Kahe Duniyawale" – Kishore Kumar, Shamshad Begum
"Mar Gayi Allah" – Kamal Barot, Shamshad Begum
"Na Koi Raha Hai" – Mukesh, Usha Khanna
"Yeh Do Deewane Dil Ke" – Mohd Rafi & Manna Dey
"Na Koi Raha Hai v2" – Mukesh & Usha Khanna

See Also
 Johar Mehmood in Hong Kong

External links

References 

1965 films
1960s Hindi-language films
1965 comedy films
Films scored by Kalyanji Anandji
Indian comedy films
Films set in Goa